Thomas Lagler (born 5 November 1968) is a Swiss freestyle skier. He competed in the men's moguls event at the 1992 Winter Olympics.

References

External links
 

1968 births
Living people
Swiss male freestyle skiers
Olympic freestyle skiers of Switzerland
Freestyle skiers at the 1992 Winter Olympics
Place of birth missing (living people)